The Lime Kilns located at the western end of Homansville Canyon near Eureka, Utah, were part of a lime quarry in the 1920s. The kilns were listed on the National Register of Historic Places in 1979.

See also
Beck No. 2 Mine, Eureka, Utah, NRHP-listed
Charcoal Kilns, Eureka, Utah, NRHP-listed
Soldier Creek Kilns, Stockton, Utah, NRHP-listed
Frisco Charcoal Kilns, Milford, Utah, NRHP-listed

References

Industrial buildings completed in 1920
Buildings and structures in Utah County, Utah
Industrial buildings and structures on the National Register of Historic Places in Utah
Lime kilns in the United States
National Register of Historic Places in Utah County, Utah